Club Nation is a mix album/compilation album, mixed by Richard Evans and compiled by Ashley Abraham, that was released on 6 April 1998. The compilation is a club mix album that consists of contemporary club tracks. The album is known for the Evian advertising contained within the CD booklet.

Evian advertising
The Evian logo is present on the album cover and in 6 pages of the booklet, whilst "CD1" of the album features a full Evian bottle and "CD2" features a crushed Evian bottle. Evian had entered into a partnership with EMI and Virgin Records for the Club Nation release, with the move representing a more youthful image for the brand.

Songs and mixing
The album includes the rare extended version of the Norman Cook remix of "Brimful of Asha" and the "Rock n Roll" remix of Let Me Entertain You".

Reception

Jason Birchmeier of Allmusic gave the album three out of five stars, saying, "it seems far too U.K.-influenced for its own good," and concluding, "It parades itself as being Australian, but at heart it's nothing but a masked U.K. mix."

Track listing

Disc one

Disc two

References

1998 remix albums
1998 compilation albums